Luis Fernando Rizo-Salom (6 December 1971 – 21 July 2013) was a Colombian composer of contemporary classical music who lived and worked in Paris since 1999. He was also a high performance athlete, member of the French hang gliding team.

Biography

Rizo-Salom obtained a master of composition at the Javeriana University in Bogotá in 1998. In 1999, he decided to come to France to continue his studies with Emmanuel Nunes at the Conservatoire de Paris. Interested in computer music and new technologies, he followed the curriculum composition and computer music at IRCAM in 2005 where he made Big Bang for viola and electronics.

Between 2005 and 2007 he was composer in residence at the Casa de Velázquez in Madrid. He also received support from institutions such as the Nadia and Lili Boulanger Foundation, the Colombian government, the Academy Villecroze, foundations Meyer, Tarrazi, Legs St. Paul, and the Georges Wildenstein (Academy of Fine Arts). His works were commissioned by the Concert Hall Shizuoka (Japan), the French ministry for culture, the Orchestre national d'Île-de-France, the Festival du Larzac, the SACEM, the IRCAM, Radio France and Steirisches Kammermusik Festival (Austria).

He received awards from the Salabert Prize Foundation in 2004, the Prix International Forum for Young Composers in 2002 (Canada), the Prize of the University of Évry, Premio Paso al Arte (Colombia).

His work included chamber works, orchestral and electroacoustic compositions played in several contemporary music festivals in Colombia, France, England, Russia, Austria, Italy, Portugal, Spain, Germany and Canada, and broadcast by national radio Canadian, French and Colombian. His work was interpreted by leading ensembles and soloists such as Ensemble Intercontemporain, ensemble Court-Circuit, Ensemble l'Itinéraire, Ensemble 2e2m, Nouvel Ensemble Modern, New Music Studio (Russia), Remix (Portugal), the Orchestre national d'Île-de-France and Christophe Desjardins, Peter Rundel, Mark Foster, Lorraine Vaillancourt, Jean Deroyer, Pascal Rophé, Susanna Mälkki, and Pierre Roullier.

In 2013 a monographic CD with his works of chamber music was released, produced and financed by the Luis Angel Arango Concert Hall in Bogotá, with the support of the Bank of the Republic (Colombia).

Rizo-Salom died in a hang-gliding accident, a sport in which he was champion of France in 2011.

Selected compositions

References

1971 births
2013 deaths
Colombian people of Lebanese descent
Colombian composers
French male composers
Colombian musicians
Colombian classical musicians
French classical composers
French male classical composers
French male musicians
20th-century classical composers
Colombian emigrants to France
20th-century French composers
20th-century French male musicians